The Pacific razor clam, Siliqua patula, is a species of large marine bivalve mollusc in the family Pharidae.

Range
Pacific razor clams can be found along the Pacific West Coast of North America from the eastern Aleutian Islands, Alaska, to Pismo Beach, California.

Description
It is similar to the smaller Atlantic razor clam, Siliqua costata, which is found on the East Coast of the United States. 

The name razor clam is also used for the Atlantic jackknife clam, Ensis directus. The Atlantic jackknife clam's genus, Ensis, is different than the Pacific razor clam's genus, Siliqua. However, they are both in the same family, Pharidae.

As food
Pacific razor clams are a highly desirable shellfish species and are collected by both commercial and recreational harvesters. Razor clams, like other shellfish, may accumulate dangerous levels of the marine toxin domoic acid. Harvesters should check current public health recommendations by marine authorities before collecting razor clams. 

In the United States, razor clam harvesting is typically authorized by state officials several times a year. Harvesters locate the clam by looking for a "show," which can present as either a hole or depression in the sand. Some clams expose their siphons as the surf is receding making them far easier to spot; this behavior is called "necking".

Razor clams are commonly battered and fried in butter. They can also be used to make clam chowder.

References

External links
 Oregon Department of Fish and Wildlife: About razor clams (Siliqua species)
 A pacific razor clam burrows rapidly into the sand

Pharidae
Marine molluscs of North America
Molluscs of the Pacific Ocean
Western North American coastal fauna
Fauna of Alaska
Fauna of California
Bivalves described in 1788